The following lists events that happened during 1932 in Chile.

Incumbents
President of Chile: Juan Esteban Montero (until June 4), Arturo Puga (until 16 June), Carlos Dávila (until 13 September), Bartolomé Blanche (until 2 October), Abraham Oyanedel (until 24 December), Arturo Alessandri

Events

October
30 October – Chilean general election, 1932

Births 
13 April – Orlando Letelier (d. 1976)
14 September – Carlos Jauregui (d. 2013)
26 October – Manfred Max-Neef (d. 2019)

Deaths
date unknown – Alberto Edwards (b. 1874)

References 

 
Years of the 20th century in Chile
Chile